The 2006–07 SM-liiga season was the 32nd season of the SM-liiga, the top level of ice hockey in Finland. 14 teams participated in the league, and Karpat Oulu won the championship.

Regular season

Playoffs

Preliminary round
 TPS - Pelicans 0:2 (0:2, 1:3)
 Lukko - Ilves 1:2 (3:2, 1:2, 2:5)

Quarterfinals
 Kärpät - Pelicans 4:0 (3:0, 2:0, 3:2 P, 1:0)
 Jokerit - Ilves 4:0 (2:1, 4:1, 6:1, 4:2)
 HPK - HIFK 4:1 (4:1, 1:2, 5:0, 4:2, 2:1 P)
 Tappara - Blues 1:4 (3:2 P, 2:3 P, 1:7, 0:2, 1:2 P)

Semifinal
 Kärpät - Blues 3:0 (4:1, 3:2, 3:2 P)
 Jokerit - HPK 3:0 (2:1 P, 2:1 P, 4:0)

3rd place
 HPK - Blues 7:2

Final
 Kärpät - Jokerit 3:0 (3:2, 4:2, 5:2)

External links
 SM-liiga official website

1
Finnish
Liiga seasons